Marek Biernacki (born 28 April 1959 in Sopot) is a Polish lawyer and politician. Biernacki previously served as the Minister of Justice in the cabinet of Prime Minister Donald Tusk between 2013 and 2014 and the Minister of Internal Affairs and Administration under the government of Prime Minister Jerzy Buzek between 1999 and 2001. He was expelled from Civic Platform in January 2018.

See also
Members of Polish Sejm 2005-2007

References

External links
 Marek Biernacki - parliamentary page - includes declarations of interest, voting record, and transcripts of speeches.

1959 births
Living people
People from Sopot
Justice ministers of Poland
University of Gdańsk alumni
Members of the Polish Sejm 1997–2001
Members of the Polish Sejm 2005–2007
Members of the Polish Sejm 2007–2011
Members of the Polish Sejm 2011–2015
Members of the Polish Sejm 2015–2019
Members of the Polish Sejm 2019–2023
Civic Platform politicians
Interior ministers of Poland